Wall of Fame is a British comedy panel game that was first broadcast on Sky1 in 2011. It is hosted by Little Britain star David Walliams and features Jack Dee, Kate Garraway, with Tamara Ecclestone for the first two episodes then Sara Pascoe took over from episode three, and Andrew Maxwell as regular panellists, alongside two weekly guests.

Premise
The premise of the show is the two teams of panellists discuss the week's top 25 most talked about celebrities in the UK.

Episode list
The coloured backgrounds denote the result of each of the shows:
 – indicates Kate and Andrew's team won
 – indicates Jack and Tamara's/Sara's team won
 – indicates the game ended in a draw

Notes

References

External links

2011 British television series debuts
2011 British television series endings
2010s British game shows
British panel games
Sky UK original programming